Spara och Slösa was a Swedish comic strip series created by Birgitta Lilliehöök, and published between the years of 1926–1963 for the Swedish bank concern Sparbanken's children's magazine Lyckoslanten. Today the comic, which has become well known for the generation growing up in mid-20th century Sweden, is illustrated by Lena Forsman.

The main characters are two girls, where Slösa ("Waste") always throws away her money on entertainment and consumption while Spara ("Save") saves her money. The comics were intended to educate children on how to spend money properly.

References

1926 comics debuts
1963 comics endings
1926 establishments in Sweden
1963 disestablishments in Sweden
Swedish comic strips
Comics characters introduced in 1926
Economics in fiction
Educational comics
Text comics
Fictional Swedish people
Swedish comics characters
Comic strip duos
Child characters in comics
Comics about women
Female characters in comics